CHPL-FM, branded as Boréal FM, is a french-language community radio station that operates at 92.1 MHz (FM) in Plamondon-Lac La Biche, Alberta, Canada.

History

On June 29, 2011, Le Club de la radio communautaire de Plamondon-Lac La Biche, received approval from the Canadian Radio-television and Telecommunications Commission (CRTC) to operate a new french-language community radio station at Plamondon-Lac La Biche, Alberta.

The station launched on June 16, 2012.

On January 1, 2020, CHPL-FM was officially branded as Boréal FM. Since its new branding, most of its broadcasting hours focuses mainly on playing pop and new-country music, with the exception of various community member volunteers hosting a diverse lineup of themed radio shows and talkshows. These community operated shows include a rather impressive variety of music genres and they generally broadcast in the evenings.

The station is a member of the Alliance des radios communautaires du Canada and ARCOT.

References

External links
CHPL 92,1 FM: La radio communautaire de Plamondon (Alberta)
 
Lac La Biche, Alberta at recnet.com

HPL
HPL
HPL
Radio stations established in 2012
2012 establishments in Alberta